Francis Rice, 5th Baron Dynevor (1804–1878) was a British clergyman and peer.

Francis Rice may also refer to:
Francis Spring Rice, 4th Baron Monteagle of Brandon (1852–1937), Anglo-Irish peer
Francis Rice, victim of Shankill Butchers
Francis Rice, victim of Provisional IRA, see Chronology of Provisional Irish Republican Army actions
Francis Rice of the 15th, and 16th New Brunswick Legislative Assembly
Francis Rice, candidate for South Down

See also

Frank Rice (disambiguation)
Frances Rice (disambiguation)